Akhay Kumar Mozumdar (July 15, 1881 – March 9, 1953) was an Indian American spiritual writer and teacher associated with the New Thought Movement in the United States. He became a naturalized American in 1913. However, in 1923, following United States v. Bhagat Singh Thind, Mozumdar was the first Indian after Bhagat Singh Thind himself to have his United States citizenship taken away.

Biography

The son of an attorney, Mozumdar was born in a small village about twenty miles north of Calcutta, India. He was the youngest child, with eight older brothers and one sister. The Mozumdars were a well-established, high caste family. Mozumdar's mother was very devout and seemed to foresee her youngest child's career as a spiritual teacher when she named him Akhay Kumar, meaning "Son of God." Mozumdar was a dynamic teacher, lecturer, and writer of the New Thought Movement in the United States during the first half of 20th century. He exhibited a deep knowledge of God and taught what he called, the "Creative Principle." After leaving his family home, he spent time traveling throughout India, and claimed that he traveled to Bethlehem in search of enlightenment about Christianity. He spent several years in China and Japan but realized that his destiny was to teach in America.

Mozumdar immigrated to the United States, arriving in Seattle, Washington, in 1904. He began attracting the interest of Americans who wanted to hear his message. In 1905 Jennie and Charles Clark, leaders in Seattle's Queen City Theosophical Society, reported in the Theosophical Quarterly Magazine that Mozumdar, 'a Hindu Brother ... has spoken for us for several weeks to full houses.' The Clarks wrote that Mozumdar "calls his teachings 'universal truth.

Mozumdar delivered lectures in primarily in  Washington State, Oregon, and California, based on his teachings that combined Christianity, Hinduism which he referred to as "Christian yoga." In 1910, Mozumdar had just begun to present a lecture on The Bhagavad Gita in Spokane, Washington, when suddenly he left his podium and raced down the aisle stopping in front of a man exclaiming, "Where have you been? What has kept you? I have been waiting for you." Mozumdar had come to America at the mandate of his own renowned guru, the Master Arumda, with whom he had studied since the age of eight. After 25 years Arumda had informed his devoted disciple that his real dharma was to serve the 'Great Plan' in America.

When Mozumdar arrived in the United States he had immediately began looking for the one waiting for his teachings. He had known immediately where Ralph M. de Bit was located as he explained to him later: ""I found you very soon. But it was two years before I could bring you out of your forests." According to DeBit's biographer, Richard Satriano, Forest Ranger DeBit had just left his job in the Bitterroot Mountains in Montana after being told by an unseen voice "Come out of the woods to the city. Come out and begin your work." Mozumdar and deBit remained together as student and teacher for nearly seven years. During that time Mozumdar bestowed upon the student he had traveled to the United States to find, the name of "Vitvan", Sanskrit for "one who knows." DeBit studied with his teacher, A K Mozumdar until 1918 when he began his own career as a lecturer and writer. 
Whenever Vitvan recalled his first meeting with Mozumdar, he always laughed, saying "When I saw that little Hindu vault into the aisle and come running towards me I was certain he was a madman. I was preparing in my mind how I would deal with him. He pulled up just short of where I was sitting. He hit me hard on the shins with his cane and shouted at me.
Before I could respond the most extraordinary thing happened. He smiled at me with great warmth and affection and laid the open palm of his hand over the lapel of my coat. My surroundings blurred and everyone and everything disappeared."

Teachings

Critique of Mozumdar's writings

U.S. immigration law
In 1913, Mozumdar became a U.S. citizen after having convinced the Spokane district judge that he was in fact Caucasian and thereby met the requirements of naturalization law then restricting citizenship to "free white persons."  On February 5, 1917, the United States Congress passed the Immigration Act of 1917 also known as the Asiatic Barred Zone Act.  Along with many other undesirables it banned Asians from immigrating to the United States.

Ten years after being granted citizenship, however, as a result of the U.S. Supreme Court decision in United States v. Bhagat Singh Thind, stipulating that no person of East Indian origin could become a naturalized United States citizen, Mozumdar's citizenship was revoked. A decision on his appeal to the Ninth Circuit Court of Appeals upheld the revocation.  The Luce–Celler Act of 1946 provided a quota of 100 East Indians to immigrate into the US and permitted East Indians to apply for and be granted citizenship. A. K. Mozumdar reapplied under the new statute and was granted U.S. citizenship in 1950. He remained in the United States until his death in San Diego in 1953, and he was buried at Forest Lawn Memorial Park in Glendale, California. Mozumdar was very close to several leaders in the International New Thought Alliance. Reverend Ernest Holmes, an American spiritual writer, teacher and founder of a Spiritual movement known as Religious Science, and author of "Science of Mind" was a close friend and admirer.  Holmes officiated at Mozumdar's large and well attended memorial service.

Major works

The Triumphant Spirit
The Conquering Man (also translated into Swedish by Eric O.G. Olson, Den segrande människan)
The Mystery of the Kingdom
The Commanding Life
 "Christ on the Road of Today Key to the New Messianic World MessageChrist SpeakethToday and TomorrowOpen Door to HeavenThe Life and the Way''

See also
 Church of Divine Science
 Ernest Holmes
 Religious Science

References

External links
 A.K. Mozumdar biography and online books website
 School of the Natural Order founded by Ralph deBit, one of Mozumdar's students/acolytes
 A contemporary approach to Vitvan 

1881 births
1953 deaths
Indian spiritual writers
Burials at Forest Lawn Memorial Park (Glendale)
New Thought writers
Place of birth missing
Place of death missing
Bengali Hindus
Former United States citizens
Indian emigrants to the United States
History of civil rights in the United States
Anti-Indian sentiment in the United States
Indian-American history
Scholars from Kolkata